Ngāti Porou is a Māori iwi traditionally located in the East Cape and Gisborne regions of the North Island of New Zealand. Ngāti Porou is affiliated with the 28th Maori Battalion, It also has the second-largest affiliation of any iwi, behind Ngāpuhi with an estimated 92,349 people according to the 2018 census. The traditional rohe or tribal area of Ngāti Porou extends from Pōtikirua and Lottin Point in the north to Te Toka-a-Taiau (a rock that used to sit in the mouth of Gisborne harbour) in the south. The Ngāti Porou iwi also comprises 58 hapū (sub-tribes) and 48 mārae (meeting grounds).

Mt Hikurangi features prominently in Ngāti Porou traditions as a symbol of endurance and strength, and holds tapu status. In these traditions, Hikurangi is often personified. Ngāti Porou traditions indicate that Hikurangi was the first point to surface when Māui fished up the North Island from beneath the ocean. His canoe, the Nuku-tai-memeha, is said to have been wrecked there. The Waiapu River also features in Ngāti Porou traditions.

History

Pre-European history

Ngāti Porou takes its name from the ancestor Porourangi, also known as Porou Ariki. He was a direct descendant of Toi-kai-rākau, Māui (accredited in oral tradition with raising the North Island from the sea), and Paikea the whale rider.

Although Ngāti Porou claim the Nukutaimemeha as their foundation canoe, many Ngāti Porou ancestors arrived on different canoes, including Horouta, Tākitimu and Tereanini. The descendants of Porourangi and Toi formed groups that spread across the East Cape through conquest and through strategic marriage alliances.

Genealogical associations with other iwi also arise through direct descent from Ngāti Porou ancestors:
 Kahungunu, descending from Ueroa (the second son of Porourangi), is the founding ancestor of Ngāti Kahungunu.
 Taua, descended from Kahungunu, is a prominent ancestor in Te Whānau-ā-Apanui genealogy.
 Ngāti Raukawa and the Tainui iwi have association through Porourangi's daughter Rongomaianiwaniwa and through the marriage of the ancestress Māhinaarangi to Tūrongo.
 Tahupōtiki, younger-brother to the Porourangi, is Ngāi Tahu's founding ancestor.

Colonial history
Ngāti Porou sustained heavy losses over the course of the Musket Wars, a period of heightened warfare between iwi unleashed by the adoption of firearms and resulting power imbalances. The iwi's first experience of musket warfare came in 1819, when a raid by Ngāpuhi rangatira Te Morenga led to the capture and killing of many members, including two rangatira. That same year a second attack by Hongi Hika of Ngāpuhi and Te Haupa of Ngāti Maru targeted the iwi’s pā at Wharekahika Bay, but Te Haupa was slain and the raid was repelled at the cost of heavy casualties. Heavy defeats came at the hands of a raiding party led by the Ngāpuhi rangatira Pōmare I and Te Wera Hauraki, who through force and guile sacked the pā of Okauwharetoa and Te Whetumatarau near Te Araroa. Te Wera Hauraki’s forces would then move on to sack additional pā in the area of Waiapu River and Whareponga Bay. A final defeat at the hands of Ngāpuhi took place in 1823, when a preemptive attack by a large army of Ngāti Porou warriors on Pōmare’s trespassing forces in Te Araroa was cut down in open field by musket fire. The rangatira Taotaoriri was then able to negotiate a favorable peace between the two iwi, a deal sealed by his marriage to the Ngāti Porou noblewoman Hikupoto and the return of Rangi-i-paea, who had been abducted and married to Pōmare in a previous raid. This peace was to have important religious consequences, as a number of Ngāti Porou rangatira freed by Ngāpuhi in later negotiations would go on to spread the Christianity they had adopted from European missionaries during the course of their captivity.

A second wave of violence rocked Ngāti Porou starting in 1829, when the presence of Ngāti Porou passengers on the ship where the Ngāti Awa rangatira Ngarara was assassinated by Ngāpuhi marked the iwi as a target for retribution. Minor raids by Ngāti Awa and their allies Whakatōhea and Te Whānau-ā-Apanui in 1829 and 1831 resulted in the deaths of some Ngāti Porou, which triggered retaliatory action from the iwi. In 1832 Ngāti Porou joined forces with Ngāpuhi, Rongowhakaata, and Te Aitanga-a-Māhaki to seize Kekeparaoa pā and expel the four hundred Whakatōhea members who had come to occupy it after being unilaterally invited to do so by a Te Aitanga-a-Māhaki hapū. A second 1832 raid, this time against Te Whānau-ā-Apanui, did not meet with the same success, as the defenders of Wharekura pā rebuffed the attackers and slew two Ngāti Porou rangatira. Two years later, a retaliatory raid by Te Whānau-ā-Apanui was in turn rebuffed by forces under the rangatira Kakatarau, whose father Pakura was killed at Wharekura. Ngāti Porou then joined forces with Te Wera’s Ngāpuhi and Te Kani-a-Takirau’s Rongowhakaata to attack Te Whānau-ā-Apanui at Te Kaha Point’s formidable Toka a Kuku pā. After six months of siege and heavy fighting, including the defeat of numerous sorties and the routing of a relief force of fourteen hundred warriors from Whakatōhea, Ngāi Tai, and Ngāti Awa, the attackers eventually proved unable to seize the pā and returned home. The extraordinary battlefield feats of the Christian Ngāti Porou rangatira Piripi Taumata-a-Kura lent him enormous prestige, which he soon leveraged to convert other Ngāti Porou rangatira and lead Te Whānau-ā-Apanui and Ngāti Porou to a peace accord in 1837.

The waning of the Musket Wars and the unifying influence of Christianity ushered in a period of relative calm and cultural development. Ngāti Porou chiefs were also signatories to the Treaty of Waitangi in 1840. Ngāti Porou experienced substantial economic growth during the 1850s.

During the 1860s, the Pai Mārire religious movement spread through the North Island, and eventually came into conflict with the New Zealand Government. From 1865–1870, a civil war emerged within Ngāti Porou between Pai Mārire converts seeking the creation of an independent Māori state (supported by Pai Mārire from other regions) and other Ngāti Porou advocating tribal sovereignty and independence. This conflict is generally viewed as part of the East Cape War.

Modern history

Ngāti Porou once again enjoyed peace and economic prosperity during the late 19th century. The 1890s saw the emergence of Sir Āpirana Ngata, who contributed greatly to the revitalisation of the Māori people. During the early 20th century, the population of Ngāti Porou increased substantially. They were active in their participation in both World Wars.

After World War II, large numbers of Ngāti Porou began emigrating from traditional tribal lands and moving into larger urban areas, in a trend reflected throughout New Zealand. A large portion of the tribal population now lives in Auckland and Wellington.

Hapū and marae

Governance

Te Rūnanga o Ngāti Porou was established in 1987 to be the tribal authority of the iwi. It is organised into a whānau and hapū development branch, economic development branch, and a corporate services branch, and aims to maintain the financial, physical and spiritual assets of the tribe. The common law trust is overseen by a board, with two representatives from each of the seven ancestral zones. As of 2022, the Rūnanga is based in Gisborne, and is chaired by Selwyn Parata, with George Reedy as the chief executive.

The trust administers Treaty of Waitangi settlements under the Ngati Porou Claims Settlement Act, represents the iwi under the Māori Fisheries Act, and is the official iwi authority for resource consent consultation under the Resource Management Act. Its rohe is contained within the territory of Gisborne District Council, which is both a regional and district council.

Media

Radio Ngāti Porou is the official station of Ngāti Porou.

Notable people

There are many notable people who are affiliated to Ngāti Porou. This is a list of some of them. 

Alex Aiono, singer
Georgina Beyer, politician
Rory Fallon, football player and assistant coach of All Whites
Rico Gear, rugby player
Hosea Gear, rugby player, coach of East Coast rugby team
Parekura Horomia politician
Witi Ihimaera, writer
Moana Jackson, lawyer 
Hone Kaa, church leader and child welfare advocate
Keri Kaa, writer, educator, and advocate for the Māori language
Wi Kuki Kaa, actor
Ka Hao, te Reo Māori youth choir
Robyn Kahukiwa, artist and children's author
Henare Mokena Kohere, farmer and soldier
Mokena Kohere, politician
Rēweti Kōhere, Anglican minister
George Nēpia, rugby player
Te Moana Nui a Kiwa Ngarimu VC
Sofia Minson, artist
Āpirana Ngata, politician
Arihia Ngata, community leader
Rob Ruha, musician
Shane Rufer, sportsman
Wynton Rufer, sportsman
William Singe, singer
John Tamihere, politician
Iritana Tāwhiwhirangi, educationalist
Tayi Tibble, poet
Te Ngahuru, 28th Maori Battalion
Mohi Turei, Anglican minister
Shannon McIlroy, lawn bowler

References

External links
Te Rūnanga o Ngāti Porou website